The String Quartet No. 1 in F major, Op. 18, No. 1, was written by Ludwig van Beethoven between 1798 and 1800, published in 1801, dedicated to the Bohemian aristocrat Joseph Franz von Lobkowitz. It is actually the second string quartet that Beethoven composed.

The quartet consists of four movements:

 Allegro con brio (F major)
 Adagio affettuoso ed appassionato (D minor)
 Scherzo: Allegro molto (F major)
 Allegro (F major)

According to Karl Amenda, Beethoven's friend, the second movement was inspired by the tomb scene from William Shakespeare's Romeo and Juliet. The quartet was heavily revised between the version that Amenda first received and the one that was sent to the publisher a year later, including changing the second movement's marking from Adagio molto to the more specific Adagio affettuoso ed appassionato. Of these modifications, Beethoven wrote: "Be sure not to hand on to anybody your quartet, in which I have made some drastic alterations. For only now have I learnt to write quartets; and this you will notice, I fancy, when you receive them."

The theme of the finale is almost directly borrowed from the finale of his earlier string trio, Op. 9, No. 3 in C minor; the themes are very closely related. The principal theme of the first movement echoes that of Mozart's Violin Sonata No. 32 K. 454 (1784) and Haydn's 1787 Opus 50, No. 1 quartet.

The "Amenda" manuscript, as it is sometimes known, was edited by Paul Mies and published by Bärenreiter around 1965, and by Henle-Verlag of Munich (perhaps also edited by Mies) in 1962. This early version of one of Beethoven's best-known works has been recorded perhaps less than a half-dozen times as of July 2014.

In popular culture

The second movement is used in the soundtrack to the 2015 film The Lobster.

Notes

References
 
  (Especially the essay by Michael Steinberg, pp. 150–155.)

Further reading
Whiting, Stephen M. (Fall 2018). "Beethoven Translating Shakespeare: Dramatic Models for the Slow Movement of the String Quartet Op. 18, No. 1." Journal of the American Musicological Society, vol. 71, no. 3, pp. 795–838.

External links

Programme notes on the Beethoven string quartets by the British broadcaster and composer Robert Simpson

String quartet 01
1800 compositions
Compositions in F major
Music with dedications